Bam or BAM may refer to:

Places

Extraterrestrial
Bam (crater), a crater on Mars
2031 BAM, an asteroid

Terrestrial
Bam (neighborhood), Tirana, Albania
Bam, Amur Oblast, a rural locality in Amur Oblast, Russia
Bam, Esfarayen, a village in Esfarayen County, North Khorasan Province, Iran
Bam, Iran, a city in Kerman Province, Iran
Bam, Jajrom, a village in Jajrom County, North Khorasan Province, Iran
Bam County, an administrative subdivision of Iran
Bam Province, Burkina Faso
Bam Rural District, an administrative subdivision of Iran
Lake Bam, Burkina Faso
Bam Island (Papua New Guinea), in the Schouten Islands

People
Bam (nickname)
Bam (surname)

Arts, entertainment, and media

Music
BAM, an alternative name for the British duo Bars and Melody
BAM! Volume 1, an album by Sister Hazel
 Bam (song), a song by Jay-Z featuring Damian Marley
 "Bam", a song by Atmosphere from the album You Can't Imagine How Much Fun We're Having

Other arts, entertainment, and media
 BAM (film), a 2015 animated short by Howie Shia
BAM (magazine) (Bay Area Music), a defunct San Francisco music magazine (1976–1999)
 BAM, a form of scoring in duplicate contract bridge; see Glossary of contract bridge terms#board-a-match
 Bianca Montgomery and Maggie Stone (BaM), characters on the soap opera All My Children
 Big Ass Monster, used to describe tougher than normal computer-controlled video game opponents, notably in TERA
 Black Arts Movement in America, 1970s
 Black American music, an umbrella term for music developed by African-Americans, especially jazz
 MLB Advanced Media (MLBAM), a streaming service of Major League Baseball
 Radio Bam, a Sirius radio station from 2004 to 2013

Brands and enterprises
BAM! Entertainment, a dormant video game publisher founded in 1999
Banca Agricola Mantovana, a defunct Italian bank
Books-A-Million or BAM!, an American book retailer
Bromma Air Maintenance, a Swedish company
Brookfield Asset Management, a Canadian financial services company
Royal BAM Group, a Dutch-based construction corporation
BAM Nuttall, a construction subsidiary of Royal BAM Group

Languages
bam, ISO 639-2 and 630-3 code for the Bambara language, spoken in Mali
Bam or Biem language, spoken in New Guinea
Bam, a dialect of the Wantoat language, spoken in Papua New Guinea

Organizations

Arts and entertainment
Baluchi Autonomist Movement, a Baluchi ethnic nationalist group
BAM Racing, a NASCAR racing team
Berkeley Art Museum and Pacific Film Archive (BAM/PFA), Berkeley, California, United States
Boise Art Museum in Boise, Idaho
Brooklyn Academy of Music, a performing arts venue in New York City
Brotherhood of Auckland Magicians (BAM), a New Zealand-based non-for-profit organisation and magic club

Other organizations
Bishop Abraham Memorial College, Thurithicadu, Kerala, India
Born Again Movement, or Zhongshengpai, a Chinese Christian religious movement
Bundesanstalt für Materialforschung und -prüfung, Federal Institute for Materials Research and Testing, Berlin

Science and technology

Biology
Billbergia 'Bam', a hybrid cultivar
Populus balsamifera, also known as Bam, the balsam poplar

Computing
 Bidirectional associative memory, a type of neural network
 Block availability map, a computer file system of Commodore DOS
 Business activity monitoring, real-time monitoring of business processes
 BOINC Account Manager (BAM!) for Berkeley Open Infrastructure for Network Computing software
 Binary angular measurement, a digital representation of angles used by computers

Medicine
 Bile acid malabsorption, a gut-related problem
 Bosma arhinia microphthalmia, an extremely rare genetic disorder in which both arhinia and microphthalmia are present
Bamlanivimab, an experimental antibody treatment for COVID-19

Other science and technology
BAM, a ceramic alloy, aluminium magnesium boride
Beta attenuation monitoring, for measurement of particle content in gas flow
Binary Alignment Map, the comprehensive raw data from genome sequencing (includes BAM files and the BAM file format)
Brewster angle microscope, for studying thin films on liquid surfaces.

Transport
BAM, station code for Bamford railway station, Bamford, Derbyshire, England
BAM, IATA and FAA LID codes for Battle Mountain Airport, Nevada, US
Baikal–Amur Mainline, a Siberian railway line
Bière–Apples–Morges railway, a railway company in Switzerland
Buque de Acción Marítima, offshore patrol vessels of the Spanish Navy

Other uses
BAM, Bosnia and Herzegovina convertible mark by ISO 4217 currency code

See also
Bam Bam (disambiguation)
Bang (disambiguation)
Boom (disambiguation)
Emeril Lagasse, known for his catchphrase "BAM!"
"Baam", a song by Momoland